Ana Luisa Montufar Urrutia (born June 16, 1993) is a Guatemalan model, environmentalist and beauty pageant titleholder who was crowned Miss Guatemala 2014 and represented Guatemala at the Miss Universe 2014 pageant.

Early life 
Ana is working for environment activist in Guatemala during her title as Miss Earth Guatemala in 2011. She is now working as model.

Pageantry

Miss Teen Guatemala 2011
Ana was crowned as Miss Teen Guatemala and became Guatemalan Ambassador for teenager queen in the country.

Miss Earth Guatemala 2011
Ana was crowned as Miss Tierra Guatemala 2011 and competed at Miss Earth 2011 in Manila, Philippines but she failed to the Top 16.

Miss Guatemala 2014
Ana was crowned as Miss Guatemala 2014 and represented Ciudad Capital on May 18, 2014. At the same pageant the runners-up title for Keyla Lisbeth Bermudez and Claudia Herrera were crowned as Miss Mundo Guatemala and Miss Internacional Guatemala 2014.

Miss Universe 2014
Ana represented Guatemala at the Miss Universe 2014 held on January 25, 2015, but failed to be placed in the Top 15 Semifinalists.

References

External links 
 Official Miss Guatemala website

1993 births
Miss Earth 2011 contestants
Living people
Miss Guatemala winners
Miss Universe 2014 contestants
Guatemalan beauty pageant winners
Guatemalan female models